Rushbrooke with Rougham is a large civil parish in the West Suffolk district of Suffolk in eastern England covering the villages of Blackthorpe, Rougham and Rushbrooke as well as Rougham Airfield. Located directly south-east of Bury St Edmunds, in 2005 its population was 1,140. One 'Henry of Rushbrook' was Abbot of Bury St Edmunds from 1235 to 1248. The site of a former stately home, Rushbrooke Hall, is situated to the south of Rushbrooke. Until April 2019 it was in the St Edmundsbury district. The parish was created on 1 April 1988 from Rougham and parts of Great Barton, Great Whelnetham and Rushbrooke.

References

External links

Civil parishes in Suffolk
Borough of St Edmundsbury